Kenneth Gilbert (24 June 1931 – 29 October 2015) was an English actor who appeared in many television and stage productions over a 50-year period. He often played authority figures such as doctors, colonels, detectives and police surgeons, but became best known as businessman Oliver Banks in the soap opera Crossroads.

Early life
Gilbert served in the Royal Air Force's Naval Rescue Service and trained as an actor at the Corona Academy in Chiswick.

Career

Gilbert trained as a classical actor at the Shakespeare Memorial Theatre in Stratford-upon-Avon. He was subsequently a member of the Royal Shakespeare Company and appeared at The Old Vic. His television appearances included Doctor Who (as World Ecology Bureau official Richard Dunbar) in The Seeds of Doom (1976), House of Cards and Softly, Softly.

Filmography

References

External links

1931 births
2015 deaths
Military personnel from Plymouth, Devon
20th-century Royal Air Force personnel
English male film actors
English male Shakespearean actors
English male stage actors
English male soap opera actors
Male actors from Plymouth, Devon
Royal Shakespeare Company members